Antonovskaya is a rural locality (a village) in Osinovskoye Rural Settlement, Vinogradovsky District, Arkhangelsk Oblast, Russia. The population was 17 as of 2010.

Geography 
Antonovskaya is located on the Severnaya Dvina River, 25 km southeast of Bereznik (the district's administrative centre) by road. Rostovskoye is the nearest rural locality.

References 

Rural localities in Vinogradovsky District